{{DISPLAYTITLE:C23H22O7}}
The molecular formula C23H22O7 (molar mass: 410.41 g/mol, exact mass: 410.1366 u) may refer to: 

 Epicocconone, a fluorescent dye
 Lactucopicrin, a bitter substance that has a sedative and analgesic effect
 Tephrosin, a natural fish poison